Charles F.  Ashley (November 9, 1936 - March 4, 2011)  was an American politician who served in the Alabama House of Representatives from 1982 to 1983.

Life
Ashley was born on November 9, 1936, in Alabama to Charles Ashley Jr. and Mamie Ludell Stevenson. His father died when Charles was around 20 years old. At some point, he married Louise Canerday Ashley and had 3 children. He died on March 4, 2011, at the age of 74.

Politics

1982 Election
Ashley was one of 3 candidates running in the Democratic primary. He won with 54% of the vote. It was only him and an Independent running for this seat because no Republican candidates have even ran since the 1966 election. He won the General Election with 76% of the votes.

References

Democratic Party members of the Alabama House of Representatives
1936 births
2011 deaths